M78 or M-78 may refer to:
 BMW M78, a straight-six engine built by BMW
 M-78 (Michigan highway), a state highway in Michigan
 Messier 78, a reflection nebula in the constellation Orion
 E-M78 also known as E1b1b1a, a Y chromosome haplogroup
 M78, or the Land of Light, the homeland of Ultraman and other Ultras